is a railway station in the city of Akita, Akita Prefecture, Japan, operated by East Japan Railway Company (JR East).

Lines
Yotsugoya Station is served by the Ōu Main Line, and is located 292.3 km from the starting point of the line at Fukushima Station.

Station layout
The station has a single island platform, connected to the station building by a footbridge. The station is unattended.  Akita Shinkansen trains run through this station, using the tracks adjacent to Platform 1.

Platforms

History
Yotsugoya Station was opened on 16 August 1917 as a station on the Japanese Government Railways (JGR). JGR became the Japanese National Railways (JNR) after World War II. The station was absorbed into the JR East network upon the privatization of JNR on 1 April 1987. A new station building was completed in 2004.

Surrounding area

See also
List of railway stations in Japan

References

External links

 JR East station information 

Railway stations in Akita Prefecture
Ōu Main Line
Railway stations in Japan opened in 1917
Buildings and structures in Akita (city)